Scrobipalpa flavinerva is a moth in the family Gelechiidae. It was described by Oleksiy V. Bidzilya and Hou-Hun Li in 2010. It is found in the Chinese autonomous region of Inner Mongolia and in Mongolia.

The forewings are grey with the veins cream, yellowish white. There is a small dark stripe at two-thirds and a small black dot at the corner of the cell. The hindwings are light grey, with dark veins. Adults are on wing from the end of June to mid-August.

Etymology
The species name refers to the wing pattern and is derived from Latin flavus (meaning yellow) and nervus (meaning vein).

References

Scrobipalpa
Moths described in 2010